Lenny Taylor is a Jamaican football coach who is last known to have coached Pompano Beach Football Club in the United States.

Early life 
Growing up poor in Kingston, Jamaica, Taylor had seven siblings and his father was a Christian carpenter.

Coaching career

Saint Vincent and the Grenadines 

Resigned as head coach of Saint Vincent and the Grenadines after the 1996 Gold Cup which saw his team lose both their group stage clashes.

Was disinterested in the idea of becoming the Saint Vincent and the Grenadines technical director again in 2016.

Saint Kitts and Nevis 
The Saint Kitts and Nevis Football Association praised for choosing Taylor as their technical director in 2005, he ran the entire football development program there, also aiding youth players in their careers. However, by 2008, the Jamaican was discharged from his duties, inequitably according to some.

References

External links 
 CV at TheReggaeBoyz.com
 at Soccerway

Saint Kitts and Nevis national football team managers
Jamaican expatriate sportspeople in the United States
Jamaican football managers
Jamaican expatriate football managers
Expatriate football managers in Saint Vincent and the Grenadines
Jamaican expatriate sportspeople in Saint Vincent and the Grenadines
Jamaican footballers
Jamaican expatriate footballers
Saint Vincent and the Grenadines national football team managers
Living people
Sportspeople from Kingston, Jamaica
Expatriate football managers in Saint Kitts and Nevis
Expatriate association football managers
Expatriate soccer players in the United States
Year of birth missing (living people)
Association footballers not categorized by position